Steely Dan is a compilation album by Steely Dan, released in Japan in 1978. It is notable as being the only album release of both sides of the 1972 single "Dallas" b/w "Sail the Waterway", although these are in mono and were sourced from a copy of the single.

Track listing
All songs by Becker and Fagen

"Do It Again" (5:52)
"Dallas" (3:08)
"Sail the Waterway" (3:04)
"Black Friday" (3:33)
"Aja" (7:56)
"Kid Charlemagne" (4:38)
"Rikki Don't Lose That Number" (4:30)

1978 compilation albums
Steely Dan compilation albums
ABC Records compilation albums